Philip Sawyers (born 20 June 1951) is a British composer of orchestral and chamber music, including four symphonies.

Sawyers was born in London. He began composing as a teenager, studying at Dartington College of Arts in Devon with Colin Sauer (violin) and Helen Glatz (composition).  His studies continued at the Guildhall School of Music where his teachers were Joan Spencer and Max Rostal (violin), and Buxton Orr, Patric Standford and Edmund Rubbra (composition).

A career as an orchestral violinist, starting in 1973 with the Royal Opera House Orchestra, Covent Garden, left little room for composition. During this time Sawyers was also teaching, primarily as the violin coach for the Kent County Youth Orchestra, and as a visiting teacher at schools and colleges. This lasted until 1997, when he opted to spend a year in postgraduate study at Goldsmiths College, leading to a resumption in composition. From 2000-2013 he was an examiner for the Associated Board of the Royal Schools of Music.

Music
Sawyers mostly favours traditional forms and absolute music with few programmatic overtones. The composer has said he felt that his largely tonal music, influenced by Hindemith, was "distinctly out of fashion" during the last three decades of the twentieth century. His first works date from his time as a student in the late 1960s and early 1970s, but he received little attention as a composer until 2001 when one of those student pieces, the Symphonic Music for Strings and Brass (1972), was taken up and performed by the Grand Rapids Symphony Orchestra in the USA. The orchestra went on to record the piece alongside the Symphony No 1 (2004), released internationally in 2011. Commissions and further performances followed.

Sawyers has benefited from his association with the Nimbus Alliance record label and the American conductor Kenneth Woods, resulting in recordings of many of his recent orchestral works and concertos. After recording the one movement Second Symphony, Woods and the English Symphony Orchestra commissioned the Third in 2016. Like the First Symphony, the Third is a full-scale, four movement work. 
It was premiered at St John's Smith Square in London on 28 February 2017. Recordings of Hommage to Kandinsky (2013) and the Fourth Symphony (2017) were released in June 2020.

The hour-long oratorio Mayflower on the Sea of Time, libretto by Philip Groom had been scheduled to receive its premiere performance on 25 April 2020 at Worcester Cathedral, with a repeat in July 2020 at the Three Choirs Festival, but the April performance was cancelled due to coronavirus. The Symphony No 5 was premiered on 28 August 2021 at the MahlerFest in Colorado.

Orchestral
 Divertimento for string orchestra (1970)
Symphonic Music for Strings and Brass (1972)
Meditation for string orchestra (1995)
Symphony No. 1 (2004)
The Gale of Life concert overture (2006)
Symphony No. 2 (2007)
Hommage to Kandinsky, symphonic poem for orchestra (2013)
Symphony No. 3 (2016)
The Valley of Vision, tone poem for orchestra (2017)
Symphony No. 4 (2017)
 Remembrance for string orchestra (2020)
Symphony No. 5 (2021)

Concertante
Four Poems for flute and string orchestra (1971)
Concertante for violin, piano and string orchestra (2006)
 Cello Concerto (2010)
 Concerto for Trumpet, Strings and Timpani (2015)
 Violin Concerto (2016)
 Elegiac Rhapsody for trumpet and strings (2016, also for trumpet and piano)
 Double Concerto (2020)
 Viola Concerto (2020)

Chamber
 String Quartet No.1 (1968)
 Piano Quintet (1968)
 Clarinet Quintet (1969)
 Divertimento for bassoon and string quartet (1969)
 Chamber Music for 10 players (1970)
 Pastoral for wind quintet (1970)
 String Quartet No.2 (1975)
 Woodwind Quintet (1975)
 String Quartet (1977)
 Elegy for string quartet (1984)
 Octet for strings (1985)
 Octet (for mixed ensemble) (2007)
 String Quartet No 3 (2008)
 Movement for string quartet (2012)

Instrumental
 Violin Sonata No. 1 (1969)
 Sentimental Piece for cello and piano (1978)
 Nocturne for cello and piano (1981)
 Homage to Haydn for solo piano (1981)
 Movement for solo cello (1993)
 Violin Sonata No. 2 (2011)
 Sonata for basset horn and piano (2011)

Vocal and choral
 Two songs for baritone and piano (1969)
 Gloria, for use in church service (1985)
 Four Shropshire Songs for soprano, clarinet and string quartet (2005)
 Songs of Loss and Regret for soprano and piano  (2014, orchestrated 2015)
 Three Shakespeare Songs for unaccompanied choir (2017)
 Mayflower on the Sea of Time oratorio (2018)

References

External links
 Philip Sawyers website
 Philip Sawyers in conversation with Kenneth Woods - Third Symphony

1951 births
20th-century classical musicians
21st-century classical musicians
20th-century English composers
21st-century English composers
Living people